Asterix and the Vikings (released in French as Astérix et les Vikings and Danish as Asterix og Vikingerne) is a 2006 Danish animated adventure film based on the French comic book series Asterix, written by Stefan Fjeldmark and Jean-Luc Gossens, and directed by Fjeldmark and Jesper Møller. A loose adaptation of the story of the comic album Asterix and the Normans, written by René Goscinny and illustrated by Albert Uderzo, the plot follows Asterix and Obelix trying to train the nephew of their village's chief, only to find themselves rescuing him from a tribe of vikings who believe him to be a Champion of Fear.

The ensemble voice cast features Roger Carel and Jacques Frantz as Asterix and Obelix, with Paul Giamatti and Brad Garrett headlining the English dub. Unlike most Asterix films, the film was produced in English first and the voice cast consisted of American actors rather than British or French actors. This adaptation introduced new characters, anachronistic references about modern technology, and cover versions of pop songs, such as "Get Down on It" by Kool and the Gang, "Eye of the Tiger" by Survivor and "Super Freak" by Rick James.

Plot 
A succession of raids leaves a tribe of Vikings without anyone to fight against them. The tribe's adviser, Cryptograf, concludes that their enemies have all fled, stating that "fear gives you wings". The Viking's chief, Timandahaf, misinterprets his adviser's words and declares they must find a "Champion of Fear", believing that if the tribe were to become great cowards, they'll be able to fly and become invincible. Cryptograf, secretly wishing to seize power from Timandahaf, goes along with it and declares that they'll find who they seek within Gaul. While en route, Timandahaf is shocked to learn that his daughter Abba snuck aboard disguised as a man, after he refused to take her with him. Despite being angry, he reluctantly keeps her among his crew.

Meanwhile, in the rebel village of the Gauls, the villagers welcome the arrival of chief Vitalstatistix's nephew Justforkix, who is to be trained to be a man. However, his nephew is more interested in chasing girls, using a bird to send messages to them, and is a vegetarian, much to the shock of Obelix. Obelix and Asterix attempt to train him to be a warrior, but lack success because of his pacifist nature and his refusal to drink the village's magic potion, which gives the villagers their super-human strength. When the Vikings arrive near their village, Cryptograf explains to his incredibly stupid son Olaf that he could claim Abba as his wife if he were to capture the Champion, thus putting him next in line as the tribe's chief, with his father secretly calling the shots.

When Olaf captures Justforkix, after witnessing his cowardice, Asterix and Obelix find themselves having to rescue him before his father visits their village. Travelling to Norway, the pair attempt to rescue Justforkix. However, he refuses to leave as he has fallen in love with Abba and she with him. When the vikings test Justforkix's flying skills by throwing him from a cliff, Cryptograf secretly rigs up a rope to him that causes him to be suspended in the foggy air. Tricked into believing he is the Champion, the Vikings rush to Olaf's wedding ceremony, leaving Justforkix to be rescued by Asterix and Obelix. Before they can take him back to Gaul, Justforkix secretly takes some magic potion, and swims back to the Viking's village.

Despite the risk, Justforkix rescues Abba, managing to fly by making an improvised hang-glider from a ship's mast and sail. While Cryptograf and Olaf are shunned for their deception, the Vikings travel back to the Gauls' village to celebrate the wedding of Justforkix and Abba. When Cacofonix decides to sing during the ceremony, the Vikings finally experience real fear and make a run for it. When Asterix asks him what fear is good for, Getafix explains how real courage means overcoming fears.

Cast

Additional English Voices
Jonathan Nichols
Philip Proctor
David Rasner
Jill Talley

Reception 
Critical reaction to Asterix and the Vikings was generally mixed, with much praise on the animation and voice acting, but with criticisms on the film's script.

Source material 

The movie is primarily based on Asterix and the Normans, but there are some elements from other Asterix books:
 As in Asterix and the Great Crossing, Asterix and Obelix travel on a boat to the land of Vikings (in the original book Asterix and the Normans they free Justforkix from Norman camp on the beach). Some other elements from this book include the Viking party, and joke about Obelix supply for the journey. The dog from the book makes a cameo.
 The scene when Asterix and Obelix dress up as Vikings "Asteraf" and "Obelaf", with Obelix unable to stop laughing about it, resembles the scene from Asterix and the Goths when the duo dress up as Romans "Asterus" and "Obelus". However, Obelix did find the names of the Normans hysterical in Asterix and the Normans, because they all ended in -af.
 The character of Cryptograf is similar to Prolix from Asterix and the Soothsayer.
 The scene in which the Gauls attack a Roman camp for Justforkix's amusement is similar to a scene in Asterix in Corsica.
 The character Influenza, from the book Asterix and Caesar's Gift, appears during the party scene, dancing briefly with Justforkix, and at the end of the movie, serving boars at Justforkix' wedding party.
 The wig on Olaf's bride/menhir is in the form of Panacea's wig from Asterix and the Actress.

Box office 
 In the Netherlands, the film has grossed a total of € 361,747. The Dutch name for the film is "Asterix en de Vikingen".

References

External links 
 
 

2006 films
2006 animated films
2000s fantasy adventure films
2006 romantic comedy films
2000s French-language films
French animated fantasy films
Danish animated fantasy films
French children's films
Danish children's films
Asterix films
Films set in Norway
Films set in the Viking Age
Animated comedy films
Animated adventure films
Animated films based on comics
Films set in Europe
Films directed by Jesper Møller
2000s children's animated films
2000s French films